Belotserkovka is a rural locality (a selo) in Belotserkovsky Selsoviet of Belogorsky District, Amur Oblast, Russia. The population was 249 as of 2018. There are 3 streets.

Geography 
Belotserkovka is located 22 km south of Belogorsk (the district's administrative centre) by road. Prigorodnoye is the nearest rural locality.

References 

Rural localities in Belogorsky District